Hearts of Space Records is a record label owned by Valley Entertainment.  The label represents several sublabels, including Hearts of Space, Hearts O'Space, Fathom, RGB, and World Class.

History
Hearts of Space Records was founded in 1984 as an outlet for music from the weekly radio show Hearts of Space. The label has released mainly contemplative music, but also features ambient, new-age, electronic, world, Celtic, classical, and experimental recordings.

Discography

References

External links
Hearts of Space Records on Valley Entertainment.com

Companies based in San Francisco
Music of the San Francisco Bay Area